Gassan Shrine (月山神社, Gassan jinja) is a Shinto shrine on Mount Gassan in Yamagata Prefecture, Japan. It was formerly a national shrine of the first rank (国幣大社, kokuhei taisha) in the Modern system of ranked Shinto Shrines. The main kami enshrined here is Tsukuyomi-no-Mikoto (月読命). It was established in 593.

The shrine's main festival is held annually on August 14.

See also
Mount Gassan
Three Mountains of Dewa

External links

Dewa Sanzan official website

Beppyo shrines
Kanpei-taisha
Shinto shrines in Yamagata Prefecture
6th-century establishments in Japan
Religious buildings and structures completed in 593